Júlia Báthory (December 31, 1901 - May 3, 2000) was a Hungarian glass designer.

Júlia Báthory was born in 1901 in Budapest into an aristocratic family. She pursued her high school studies in Debrecen and Budapest. She went to Germany in 1924, where she graduated at the Stadtschule für Angewendte Kunst in Munich. While there, she was a student of Adelbert Niemeyer, a painter and porcelain designer, and a family relative of the well known Brazilian architect, Oscar Niemeyer. She also took lectures from local painter Max Müller (not related to the orientalist). Her fellow student was Margit Kovács, the well known Hungarian ceramic artist, with whom she had a lifelong, close friendship.

In the course of her graphic studies she became fascinated by glasswork and in 1929 she started her career as an independent glass-designer in Dessau. The Bauhaus School was located in Dessau at this time and was an influence on Báthory. Between 1930 and 1931 she returned to Budapest. Her exhibition in 1930 in Paris with sculptor Imre Huszár was such a success that she decided to move there, where she remained until 1939.

The Paris years - 1930 - 1940
Báthory's ten years in Paris were the most productive years of her life. During this time she visited excavations from the Roman period in the south of France, and traveled to Italy, Germany, Switzerland, and Belgium. She lived as a member of the Hungarian colony, formed by Endre Rozsda, Brassaï, and André Kertész. During her first years in Paris, she shared an apartment together with Andre Kertész and Margit Kovács. After her exhibition in 1930, she presented her first independent show in 1933. She received a diplome d'honneur at the 1937 Paris World's Fair. That same year, she made an interior column-panneau for Le Printemps. Báthory was a member of the Salon d'Automne, formed by Matisse and the fauvists, where famous French glass designers Maurice Marinot and René Lalique also exhibited. She produced revolutionary flat glass design artifacts for "La Crémmaiere", and made panneaux for the interior decoration department of Louis Cartier's store at Rue de la Paix. Her works were sold by Christofle in Paris. In 1934, she converted an old dairy hall near the Sorbonne (7bis Rue Laromiguiere, Paris Ve) into her own atelier (or workshop), Studio La Girouette.

Báthory produced her own designs in small series by the Swedish Orrefors Glasbruk. She got her flat glass boards from Belgium. She also dealt with interior decoration: she designed and produced furniture. She had great success not only with her figural panneau, but with her plaquettes, decorated with abstract animals. In 1937, the city of Paris bought her plaquette called The Hunting (La Chasse) and an engraved vase. These two pieces of art were later placed in the collection of modern art of the Louvre. She achieved her greatest success by working with cold glass, by monumental, sculptural drawing-derived forms, while her contemporaries, Lalique, Marinot and his circle made their art in glass-works and treated glass as one block.

Her invention was a unique use of intaglio engraving, cutting, and the artistic use of the sand-blasting technique. She was able to create outstanding visual effect with their combination.

French critiques used the expression "reliefs du verre" to describe her works. She visited home in 1938 to exhibit her work and received a Professional Silver Medal. That same year she was an invited exhibitor of the City of Paris. The following year she reached overwhelming success overseas. She returned from the 1939 New York World's Fair with a diploma of honor.

Moving back to Hungary - 1940
Báthory remained in Paris until 1939, but moved to Budapest in January 1940 in order to save her studio. She worked continuously until 1944, when the operations of war reached the territory of Hungary. During this period she received a number of awards and accolades, including a gold medal at the Milano Trienale in 1940, awards from the Ministry of Culture in 1942 and 1943, an award from the city of Kassa in the Second Hungarian Exhibition of Applied Arts, a silver medal from the National Organisation of the Applied Artists of Hungary, and a gold medal from Budapest.

Báthory worked abroad with interior designer Elek Falus during this period. She produced engraved and cut figural panneau that covered columns for the Zürich exhibition hall of the Goldberger Textil Company. Many of her pieces at this time were ecclesiastical. These pieces continued a religious theme she had used earlier when creating work in 1937 for the Exhibition of Religious Art (l'Exposition d'art religieux, 1935) in Strasbourg. She received great attention for one of her engraved triptichons.

During World War II, Báthory's studio was almost completely destroyed. After the war ended she was frequently robbed, and a great number of irreplaceable documents, machines, and works of art disappeared. Her return to Hungary - originally intended as a temporary stay - became permanent. Despite the thefts and her separation from Paris, Báthory continued her work with enthusiasm. In 1949, she created an educational system for glass design at the Moholy-Nagy University of Art and Design (formerly known as the College of Applied Arts), however, the system could not be realized at that time. Years later in 1953, she had the opportunity to enact her educational system at the Secondary School of Fine and Applied Arts.

Júlia Báthory, the teacher 1953 - 1970
The glass design program Báthory created was a unique initiative. She constructed the whole basis of theoretical and practical education of glass design in Hungary. The system is similar to the Kodály-method. Students learn how to work with hot glass, use drawing-derived techniques, and are exposed to the whole range of glass-work. This method greatly influenced the education of glass-art, and also changed the whole structure of secondary art-education in Hungary. She was presented with the Munkácsy prize and the title of Excellent Teacher in thanks for her work.

At this time Báthory's attention turned towards the possibilities of hot glass. In 1958, she exhibited at the Brussels World's Fair - her last public, international show. She returned from Brussels with a diplome d'honeur. She was awarded for her work again in 1967 and 1968. Báthory retired from teaching in 1970, but continued to work in her studio and started to organize her life's work.

Last years - 1990 - 2000
Júlia Báthory's artistic resurrection was brought about in 1989 with the change of the Hungarian political and economical system. The 88-year-old artist set up her studio again with the help of her adopted son, András Szilágyi, and her daughter-in-law, Júlia Kovács. Báthory decided to recreate pieces from her collection of work that were lost or destroyed. The studio continues to reproduces these works and carries out Báthory's designs.

In 1991, she received the Golden Wreath-ornamented Star-order of the Hungarian Republic, and became full member of the Széchenyi István Academy of Literature and Art. Her life work was exhibited in the Hungarian Museum of Applied Arts in 1992. She also received the Hungarian Heritage Award, but could not accept it personally. She died in Pécsvárad at the age of 98.

Since then András Szilágyi, her stepson, and Júlia Kovács, her daughter-in-law, are running a permanent museum and continue to run Báthory's studio, La Girouette. Since September 2000, the Báthory Júlia glass-collection is opened to the public in Dömsöd.

Bibliography
Au Salon d'Autumn: Art et Décoration, 1930/2 p177-194, 1932/2 p 353-364, 1933/2, 1938/ p214-222, p230-232, p235, p250, p254, p256
Arwas, Victor: Glass: Art Nouveau to Art Deco, Yale University Press, London – New York, 1977
Bachet, Roger:T.S.F. et Décoration - Un probléme d'esthétique, Plaisir de France, 1937 November
Beard, Geoffrey: International Modern Glass, Barrie & Jenkins, 1976, London
Brinhammer, Yvonne – Tise, Suzanne: French Decorative Art 1900-1942, Flammarion, 1990, Paris
Bruckhardt, Lucius: The Werkbund: Studies in the History and Ideology of the Deutscher Werkbund, Design Council, London, 1980
Campbell, Joan: The German Werkbund: The Politics of Reform in Applied Arts, Princeton University Press, 1978
Drescher Károly – Rudák István – Száder Rudolf: Szakmai alapismeretek üvegesek részére, Építésügyi Tájékoztató Kózpont, 1981, Budapest
Duncan, Alastair: Art Deco, Thames & Hudson, 1995, London
Falus János: Báthory Júlia, Magyar Iparművészet, 2000/3 p14-17
Gurmai Mihály dr.: Az üvegművészet technikái, Tankönyvkiadó - MIF, 1980, Budapest
Hallóssy István: A párizsi világkiállítás magyar pavilonjának sikermérlege, Budapest, 1937
Hoffman, Josef – Wagenfeld, Wilhelm: Glas-kunst der Moderne, Klinkhardt & Biermann, 1992, München
ifj Richter Aladár: Báthory Júlia, Magyar Iparművészet, 1937/ p42-43, p48-49, p157-162
kat.: Exposition 1937 Paris, Paris, 1937
Kovács Anikó – Szilágyi András: Interjú Báthory Júliával, Széchenyi István Irodalmi és Művészeti Akadémia, magnóval rögzített, utólag legépelt anyag iksz.: MA-52-1/94
Le Corbusier: L’Art Décoratif d’aujord’hui, 1925, Párizs
Lengyel Ferenc: Az 1939 évi new yorki világkiállítás és a gyorsközlekedési úthálózat fejlődése, Budapest, 1939
Lhote, R.: Au Salon d'Automne - Julia de Bathory, Glaces et Verres, 1937
Lotz, Wilhelm: Exposition der Deutscher Werkbund á Paris, Die Form, 1930/5.
Magyar Iparművészet, 1941/ p133-138, p145
Melegati, Luca: Az üveg, Officina Nova, 1995, Budapest
Mihalik Sándor: Az első Magyar Országos Iparművészeti Tárlat, Magyar Iparművészet,
Muller, Joseph-Émile – Elgar, Frank: Modern Painting, Eyre Meuthen, 1980, London
nn.: A kassai Országos iparművészeti tárlat krónikája, Magyar Iparművészet, 1942-44/1943/ p61-63, p67, p103, p112-114
nn.: A new yorki világkiállítás magyar pavilonja, Magyar Iparművészet, 1939/ p154, p157-164
nn.: Az 1940-es Egyházművészeti kiállítás mérlege, Magyar Iparművészet, 1941/ p29-30, p33, Dr Ruzicska Ilona: „Művészet az iparban” Az iparművészeti Társulat karácsonyi tárlata,
nn.: Az Orsz. Magy. Iparművészeti Társulat nyári tárlatának mérlege, Magyar Iparművészet, 1931/ p133,141
nn.: Beszámoló a Brüsszeli világkiállításról, Magyar Építőművészet, 1958/2 p47-51, 1959/1-2
nn.: Egy Debreceni származású magyar hölgy nagy sikere az országos iparművészeti kiállításon Hajdúföld, 1929 július 17.
nn.: Magyarország az 1937 évi világkiállításon, Budapest, 1937
nn.: Salon d’Automne, L’Illustration, 1937/4 p 354-368, 1934/2 p433-451, 1935/1 p126 1936/2 p456-467 1937/2 p360-378
Passarge, Walter: Deutsche Werkkunst der Gegenwart, Im Rembrandt Verlag, 1934, Berlin
Pasurek, Gustav E.: Gläser der Empire und Biedermeierzeit, 1925, Lipcse
R.M.U.: Les expositions des Décorateurs, Beaux-Arts: Le Journal des Arts, 1937 XII.24.
Rivir, A.: L'Orvfévrerie, La renesaince, 1937/2
Sághelyi Lajos, dr.: A magyar üvegesipar története, Budapesti Üvegesek Ipartestülete, 1938, Budapest
Szablya János: A VII. Trienálé, Magyar Iparművészet, 1940/ p43-47, p51, p91-94
Szilágyi B. András: Báthory Júlia, 2000, Báthory Júlia Üveggyűjtemény 
Tasnádiné Marik Klára: A síküveg felhasználása belső térben, Építőanyag, XIX,évf. 1967/7 p245-249
Varga Vera: Báthory Júlia - Párizs Budapest, az Iparművészeti Múzeum katalógusa, 1992, 
Varga Vera: Báthory Júlia, Magyar Iparművészet, 1993/1 p46-50
Varga Vera: Báthory Júlia, Új Művészet, 1991/12 p26-30
Vávra, J.R.: Das Glas und die Jahrtausende, Artia, 1954, Prága
Wettergen, Erik: The Modern Decorative Arts of Sweden, Malmö Museum – American-Scandinavian Foundation, 1926, Malmö - New York
Woodham, Johnathan M.: Twentieth Century Design, Oxford History of Art, Oxford University Press, 1997, Oxford

References

Szilágyi B. András: Báthory Júlia, Báthory Júlia Üveggyűjtemény, 2000, 
Varga Vera: Báthory Júlia - Párizs Budapest, Iparművészeti Múzeum, 1992,

External links
Her short biography in Hungarian
The summary of her biography by Vera Varga in Hungarian
An article about her and others in English
Her Museum's address and contacts

 http://www.cmog.org/life-archaeology-and-glass-honoring-david-whitehouse-1941-2013

Glass artists
Women glass artists
Hungarian artists
1901 births
2000 deaths
Hungarian women artists